Vergota is a Spanish surname.

People 
 Bob Verga, retired American basketball player
 Giovanni Verga, Italian writer
 Solomon ibn Verga, 15th-century Spanish rabbi
 Judah ibn Verga, 15th-century Spanish rabbi
 Joseph ibn Verga, 16th-century Spanish rabbi

Places

United States
 Vergas, Minnesota
 Verga, New Jersey

Sephardic surnames